Martha High (born Martha Harvin in 1945, Victoria, Virginia) is an American female vocalist.

Harvin grew up in Washington, D.C., attending Roosevelt High School and singing in Trinity AME Zion Church. She began singing in The Four Jewels (whose members attended the same church and school) after the departure of Carrie Mingo. After Martha joined the group, they changed their name simply to The Jewels and released their best-known hit, "Opportunity". After a follow-up single, "But I Do" b/w "Smokey Joe", flopped, they were dropped from Dimension Records.

The Jewels went on tour with James Brown in 1964, with a demanding nightly schedule. They visited the studios of Motown Records on the Detroit leg of the tour, hoping to record, but the building was closed that day. They did record two singles while they toured with Brown, but after a year and a half with Brown the group split up. Not ready to leave the tour, Harvin asked Brown if she could stay. Brown agreed, but he required her name change from Harvin to the stage name High. She continued singing with Brown for the next 30-plus years. Among her appearances with Brown are on the track "Summertime" and on the Original Funky Divas album.

High also recorded a self-titled disco album in 1979, released on Salsoul Records. In January 2000, she stopped performing with Brown and went on tour with Maceo Parker.

In 2004, High teamed up with the Soulpower organization, which is also behind the comebacks of Soul artists like Marva Whitney, Lyn Collins, Bobby Byrd, Gwen McCrae and RAMP. During her collaboration with Soulpower, High performed all across Europe and even performed in Africa, backed by the Soulpower Allstars. In February 2005, High embarked on the "James Brown's Funky Divas Tour" in Europe, sharing the stage with her friend Lyn Collins.

In 2016, High released her solo album on Blind Faith Records, with 11 original tunes produced and recorded by Italian soul man Luca Sapio and his crew.

In 2017, High recorded a single titled "We are one" with DJ Toner, released on Enlace Funk (Spain). Fred Thomas (The J.B.´s musician) also collaborated playing bass.

In 2021, High recorded an album titled "Got My Senses Back" with Grey and the Hit Me Band, released on Only One Records with 9 tracks arranged, produced and recorded by Michael Edell.

Single discography

Album discography
 High (Salsoul 8526) released 1979
 Live at Quai Du Blues (Austerlitz Music 5978012) released 2003
 W.O.M.A.N. by Martha High With Shaolin Temple Defenders (Soulbeats 004[CD]/005[LP]) released 2008
 It's High Time (Diaspora Connections 90101) released 2009
 Soul Overdue by Martha High & Speedometer (Freestyle FSRCD096[CD]/FSRLP096[LP]) released 2012
 Singing For The Good Times by Martha High (Blind Faith Records BF01002 [CD]/[LP]) released 2016
 Tribute To My Soul Sisters by Martha High (Rekord Kicks Records RKX 067 [CD]/[LP]) released 2017
 Nothing's Going Wrong by Martha High & The Italian Royal Family, released 2020
 Got My Senses Back by Martha High & Grey and the Hit Me Band (Only One Records [Digital]) released 2021

Other appearances
 Presenting… The James Brown Show (LP by various artists, 1967) Smash 27087 (mono) & 67087 (stereo)
"This Is My Story" and "Something's Got A Hold On Me" by The Jewels
 James Brown's Original Funky Divas (CD compilation, 1998) PolyGram 314 537 709-2
"This Is My Story" by The Jewels
"Summertime" by Martha And James
 Love Over-Due (album by James Brown, 1991) Scotti Bros. 72392 75225-1
"Later For Dancing" (duet with James Brown)
 Martha High (CD, 2014) on Octave-lav/Ultra-Vybe inc. 5067)
Reissue of Salsoul 8526 with 4 bonus-tracks

References

[ Martha High] at Allmusic

American women singers
American soul musicians
Singers from Washington, D.C.
Living people
1945 births
People from Victoria, Virginia
21st-century American women